Anne Veski (born Anne Vaarmann; 27 February 1956) is an Estonian pop singer who has recorded music in both her native language as well as Russian.

Biography 
Anne Veski was born as Anne Vaarmann in Rapla, Estonia. She graduated from the musical school in the town, after which she entered the Tallinn University of Technology. Upon finishing her education, she became a professional singer and started working as a soloist with the ensembles Mobile and Vitamiin. Her first notable Estonian language hit song was "Roosiaia kuninganna" ("Queen of the Rose Garden") in 1980. Other prominent Estonian hits were "Troopikaöö" ("Tropical Night") in 1979, "Viimane Vaatus" ("Last Act"), in 1983 and "Jääd või ei?" ("Will You Stay or Not?") in 1986.

Having organized the ensemble Nemo, Veski began her solo career in 1984. In that same year, she participated in the Sopot International Song Festival in Poland. In the contest, she received First Awards in two categories: the Amber Nightingale for the best performance of a Polish song (with the entry "Polka Idolka") and the  Intervision Song Contest for the song "Nadezhda gasnet". The Intervision First Prize was in fact a runner-up position, as the winner Krystyna Giżowska received the Grand Prix.

Popular Russian language songs in her repertoire include "Vozmi menya s soboy" ("Take Me With You"; 1983), "Milyy, goryacho lyubimyy" ("My Darling Beloved One"; 1994) and "Radovat'cya zhyzni" ("Enjoy Life"; 2001).

In 1987, Veski performed in the Estonian rockumentary Pingul keel (Tightened String) with other such notable Estonian singers and musicians as Urmas Alender, Ivo Linna and Tõnis Mägi.

In the beginning of the 1990s, Veski and V. Dovganiy organized a collection of fur clothing for sale in Tallinn and Moscow.

Family 
Veski was married to her second husband, Benno Beltšikov, who was also her manager. Benno Beltšikov died 1 May 2022 at age 74. Her daughter from her first marriage is a diplomat and has worked at the Estonian Consulate in Moscow. Her first husband was lyricist Jaak Veski (1956–1994), who died after their divorce.

Acknowledgements
Merited Artist of the Estonian SSR (1984)
Order of the White Star, V Class

Selected discography

Solo
 Anne Veski (1983)
Поет Анна Вески (1983) EP	
Позади крутой поворот (1984) EP		
Sind aeda viia tõotan ma! (1985)	
Я обещаю вам сады (1985)
Радоваться жизни (1986) EP	
Pihtimus (1995)
Armukarneval (2000)	
Diiva (2000)		
Не грусти, человек (2002)
Lootus (2003)
Ни о чем не жалейте (2004)
Live 2008 (2008)
Ingleid ei (2009)	
Kõike juhtub / Все бывает (2010)		
Sünnipäev kahele (2011)
Kallis, kuula (2013)
Võta minu laul (2016)
Ma tänan teid : juubelikontserdi live (2016)
 Anne Veski "Veereb, aeg nii veereb" (2018)

Collaborations
Anne Veski ja ansambel "Muusik-Seif" (1983), Anne Veski ja Muusik-Seif
Tänan! (1988), Anne Veski & Nemo
Kutse tantsule nr. 9: Suvekuningannad (1998), Anne Veski & Marju Länik
Sünnipäev kahele (2011), Anne Veski & Ain Tammesson

References

External links 

 Anne Veski's Official Myspace
Official site (in Estonian)
Official site (in Russian)
Visiting the star Anne Veski: "I live like a queen!" (in Russian)
https://news.err.ee/1608583693/music-manager-benno-beltsikov-dies

1956 births
Living people
People from Rapla
20th-century Estonian women singers
Estonian pop singers
Russian-language singers
Soviet women singers
Soviet pop singers
Tallinn University of Technology alumni
Recipients of the Order of the White Star, 5th Class
21st-century Estonian women singers